Tumar Kandi may refer to:
 Tumar Kandi, Ardabil (توماركندي - Tūmār Kandī)